Bomera, New South Wales is  a bounded rural locality in New South Wales. The suburb is adjacent to the town of Binnaway and lies on the Binnaway to Werris Creek Railway. The locality is southeast of Coonabarabran. Though the station closed in the late 1970s. The area is largely agricultural in its economic activity.

References

History of New South Wales
Geography of New South Wales
Localities in New South Wales